Pleurodema kriegi is a species of frog in the family Leptodactylidae.
It is endemic to Argentina.
Its natural habitats are temperate grassland, intermittent freshwater marshes, and rocky areas.
It is threatened by habitat loss.

References

Pleurodema
Amphibians of Argentina
Endemic fauna of Argentina
Taxonomy articles created by Polbot
Amphibians described in 1926